The InterContinental Dhaka is a prominent luxury hotel in Ramna in central Dhaka, the capital of Bangladesh. It opened in 1966 and is owned by the Bangladeshi government.

History 

The Inter-Continental Dacca opened in 1966, when the city, then known as Dacca, was the capital of East Pakistan. The hotel was the first international five star hotel in what would soon become the nation of Bangladesh. It was designed by architect William B. Tabler.

The hotel played host to many important political events in the run up to the independence of Bangladesh, including negotiations on the transfer of power after the 1970 elections. During the Bangladesh Liberation War in 1971, it was declared a neutral zone by the International Red Cross. Many buildings in its surrounding neighborhoods were targeted by the Pakistani military, including newspaper offices and university halls.

InterContinental Hotels operated the hotel until 1983, when it was taken over by Sheraton, becoming the Sheraton Dhaka Hotel. In 2011, Sheraton announced that it would end its contract with the Bangladeshi government to manage the hotel, which was renamed the Ruposhi Bangla Hotel. In 2013, it was announced that InterContinental Hotels would re-assume management of the state-owned property, following a major renovation. The hotel closed on September 1, 2014 and reopened as the InterContinental Dhaka on December 19, 2018.

Location
The vicinity of the hotel includes the Shahbag roundabout, the Suhrawardy Udyan, Ramna Park, the Dhaka Club, the University of Dhaka, BSMMU, BIRDEM Hospital, the Bangladesh National Museum and official state guest houses.

References

InterContinental hotels
Hotels established in 1966
Hotel buildings completed in 1966
Hotels in Dhaka